Scott Johnson (born 19 August 1962 in Sydney), is an Australian rugby union coach, who was the interim head coach for Scotland in 2013 and early 2014 before serving as a Director of Rugby for Scotland between 2014 and 2019 before returning to Australia in the same role between 2019 and 2021.

Playing career
Playing as a fly-half or a centre, Johnson played for Parramatta Two Blues and Eastwood, and was captain of both the New South Wales Waratahs and Australian Under 21s. Playing initially at fly half and then at centre, he played senior rugby for New South Wales Waratahs. In the 1980s Johnson also played for French club Toulon in the French championship.

Coaching career
Johnson started his coaching career with Penrith in the Sydney First Grade competition, and was named Club Coach of the Year in 1999. Johnson then worked as an assistant coach at New South Wales Waratahs in 2001, as well as an assistant for the Australia A team who defeated the British and Irish Lions in Gosford.

Following an invitation from Graham Henry, Johnson left Australia to work with the then struggling Wales in the Six Nations Championship as Skills Coach. Working briefly under Henry and then for two years under Steve Hansen, Johnson was an integral member of the Welsh coaching staff during the 2003 Rugby World Cup. He remained with Wales when Hansen left in 2004 and was involved with Wales for their 2005 Grand Slam. Following the resignation of Mike Ruddock in 2006, Johnson took over as head coach on a temporary basis, ending his career with Wales in Cardiff after three games: a 31–5 defeat to Ireland in Dublin, an 18–18 draw against Italy in Cardiff, before going down to eventual Champions France 21–16.

In light of family pressures, he accepted an approach from new Wallabies head coach John Connolly to become Australia's attack coach in preparation for the 2007 Rugby World Cup.

Following a disastrous campaign and the reorganisation of the coaching staff, Johnson was released from this role following the 2007 World Cup and the signing of Robbie Deans as the new head coach of Australia. Johnson was linked with a move to the Cardiff Blues as skills coach, but decided not to accept this offer. Johnson's decision to say no to the Blues led to speculation linking him with the ambitious Ospreys. On 20 March 2008, the BBC reported that Johnson has accepted the head coaching position for the US Eagles national team.

In January 2009, Johnson was linked with a move to coach the Ospreys. On 29 January, he was confirmed as the Ospreys' new director of coaching. He joined the team after he served a three-month notice period required by his USA contract.

It was announced in December 2011 that Johnson would leave his post with the Ospreys at the end of his three-year contract. In June 2012, he joined Scottish coach Andy Robinson as his assistant coach through the 2012 Scottish tour of Oceania and the 2012 Autumn internationals. Head Coach Andy Robinson resigned his position after their 21–15 defeat to Tonga, which ended in the result of Scott Johnson being announced as head coach for Scotland. On 3 May 2013, Johnson was announced as Director of Rugby for Scotland Rugby, a post which had been vacant since Sir Ian McGeechan resigned in 2005, and would oversee all rugby in Scotland. However, he remained interim head coach for Scotland until a suitable head coach was found for the national side. Under Scott Johnson's leadership, Scotland won two Six Nations games against Italy (one at home and one away), plus a win against Ireland.

On 15 March 2014, Johnson took charge of his final game (Wales V Scotland) making way for Vern Cotter's arrival as head coach.

International matches as head coach

Record by country

References

External links
Management profiles: Wales Senior Team Welsh Rugby union

1962 births
Living people
Rugby union players from Sydney
New South Wales Waratahs players
Australian rugby union coaches
Scotland national rugby union team coaches
Wales national rugby union team coaches
United States national rugby union team coaches
Ospreys (rugby union) coaches